Louis-Lewin-Straße is a surface level Berlin U-Bahn station in the German capital city of Berlin. It is part of the  Berlin U-Bahn; the station is located on the  line.

The station opened in July 1989, just a few months before the fall of the Berlin Wall. The station was formerly located in Hönow, and the surrounding area was annexed by Berlin during German reunification on 3 October 1990.

The eastern extension of (what is now) line U5 was one of the last major construction projects of the former German Democratic Republic.

It was originally called Hönow-West in planning stages. In 1989 up to 1991 the name of the station was Paul-Verner-Strasse, however as P. Verner was an SED politician the name was changed after the reunification of Germany to the toxicologist and professor at the Humboldt University Lewin (1850–1929).

References 

U5 (Berlin U-Bahn) stations
Buildings and structures in Marzahn-Hellersdorf
Railway stations in Germany opened in 1989
1989 establishments in East Germany